Jana Jae (born August 30, 1943) is an American country and bluegrass fiddler.

Early life and education
She started playing when she was two and a half years old. Both of her parents were violin students at the Juilliard School in New York, and her maternal grandfather was a country fiddler. In her youth, Jae won scholarships to Interlochen and the International String Congress. She graduated magna cum laude with a degree in music and studied abroad at the Vienna Academy of Music.

Career
She gained national fame by appearing on the nationally broadcast CBS/syndicated television series Hee Haw as part of Buck Owens's band in the 1970s. Prior to her work with Owens, she won the Ladies' Division National Fiddling Championship. Her trademark is playing a blue fiddle.

Since the late 1970s, Jae has continued performing internationally, both as the leader of her own band, and with orchestra. Additionally, she has appeared with such country music artists as Mel Tillis, Ricky Skaggs, Chet Atkins, Roy Clark, Ray Stevens, The Oakridge Boys, and the Nitty Gritty Dirt Band.

Jae also organizes an annual fiddle camp and fiddle festival in Grove, Oklahoma.

Personal life
In 1977, Jae was married to Buck Owens while a performing fiddler with the Buckaroos. Jae and Owens were married for only a few days before Owens filed for annulment. However, Owens changed his mind and the couple had an off-and-on relationship for an additional year before a divorce was finalized.

References

External links 
Official homepage 
 Voices of Oklahoma interview. First person interview conducted on May 9, 2018, with Jana Jae.

1942 births
Living people
American bluegrass fiddlers
American women country singers
American country singer-songwriters
American country fiddlers
People from Grove, Oklahoma
Singer-songwriters from Oklahoma
Country musicians from Oklahoma
21st-century American women